The 1971 Yankee 400 was a NASCAR Winston Cup Series race that took place at Michigan International Speedway on August 15, 1971. The purse for this event was $51,015 ($ when adjusted for inflation).

Background
Groundbreaking took place on September 28, 1967. Over  of dirt were moved to form the D-shaped oval. The track opened in 1968 with a total capacity of 25,000 seats. The track was originally built and owned by Lawrence H. LoPatin, a Detroit-area land developer who built the speedway at an estimated cost of $4–6 million. Financing was arranged by Thomas W Itin. Its first race took place on Sunday, October 13, 1968, with the running of the USAC 250 mile Championship Car Race won by Ronnie Bucknum.

Race report
There were 26,000 fans in attendance for this two hour, forty minute race in Brooklyn, Michigan There were two cautions for twelve laps and the victory margin was three seconds. All forty competitors in this race were born in the United States of America. 200 laps were undertaken on the paved oval track spanning .

Manufacturers involved in this race included Mercury, Ford, Dodge, Chevrolet, and Plymouth. 

Friday Hassler blew his vehicle's engine on lap 7. Bobby Isaac had a problem with his vehicle's water pump on lap 11. Benny Parsons blew his engine on lap 29. Henley Gray's vehicle had a problematic suspension on lap 38. Fuel pump issues forced Ed Negre out of the race on lap 40. Dave Marcis overheated his vehicle on lap 45. Problems with the clutch caused John Sears to exit the race on lap 49. Coo Coo Marlin blew his vehicle's engine on lap 76. Dick May overheated his vehicle on lap 84.

Engine problems happened for Pete Hamilton on lap 87. Pete Hamilton had the only car that could possibly beat Bobby Allison; he would overtake Allison on laps 31, 40, 46, and 49 before losing dominance over Bobby Allison on lap 50. Problems with the vehicle's ignition forced Johnny Halford out of the race on lap 94. Bill Seifert's vehicle had a troublesome fuel pump on lap 110; forcing his early exit from the race. Dean Dalton had engine issues on lap 125 that forced him out of the race while Charlie Glotzbach dealt with the same issue on lap 129.

Qualifying

Finishing order
Section reference:

References

Yankee 400
Yankee 400
NASCAR races at Michigan International Speedway